A list of music venues in Los Angeles, California.

List of venues

Gallery

See also
 List of concert venues

References

Venues
Los Angeles
Venues
Los Angeles